Emissaries is Melechesh's fourth full-length album and third through Osmose Productions. The album introduces their new drummer Xul (who has been performing with them since 2004). The Album  contains an instrumental Bonus Track - Extemporized Ophtalmic Release - it is not titled on the track listing but is number 11 on the CD, the given name of this track basically refers to it being an unplanned improvised jam.

Track listing

References

 

2006 albums
Melechesh albums